Eberson is a surname. Notable people with the surname include:

John Eberson (1875–1954), Ukrainian American architect
Jon Eberson (born 1953), Norwegian jazz guitarist and composer
Lennart Eberson, (1933–2000), Swedish chemist
Marte Eberson, Norwegian keyboardist and composer

See also
Ebberston